Selliah Ponnadurai (25 April 1935 – 15 August 2013) was a Sri Lankan cricket umpire. He stood in three Test matches between 1985 and 1993 and eight ODI games between 1983 and 1993. He died in 2013 at  the age of 78.

See also
 List of Test cricket umpires
 List of One Day International cricket umpires

References

1935 births
2013 deaths
People from Jaffna
Sri Lankan Test cricket umpires
Sri Lankan One Day International cricket umpires